Mary Candace Hilligoss (born August 14, 1935) is an American former actress and model. She gained fame for her role as Mary Henry in the independent horror film Carnival of Souls (1962).

Life and career

1935–1946: Early life
Mary Candace Hilligoss  was born August 14, 1935 in Huron, South Dakota, the daughter of L.F. Hilligoss. She was raised in Huron, where she was active in school plays.

After studying at Huron College and the University of Iowa (where she acted in theatrical productions) for three years, she went to New York City to study acting with a scholarship to the American Theatre Wing, studying under Sanford Meisner and Lee Strasberg. She made her professional acting debut in summer stock in Pennsylvania. She acted at the Cape Cod Playhouse, appeared in a touring production of Idiot's Delight with Nina Foch, performed in television programs produced in New York, and worked as a dancer at the Copacabana nightclub.

1947–1961: Modeling
After college, Hilligoss attended the Barbizon Modeling and Acting School in New York. Following her graduation from there in 1956, she was one of five models who traveled to South America on a month-long tour to demonstrate then-new American fashions.

1962–2001: Acting career and later life
She is best known for her portrayal of Mary Henry, a church organist haunted by specters, in Carnival of Souls (1962), a low-budget horror film that has developed a cult following. She had been offered a role in the Richard Hilliard-directed horror film Psychomania (1963), but opted for the role in Carnival of Souls. She stated that at the time, she took the role as a "take-the-money-and-run type of situation"; she was paid approximately $2,000 for her work in the film.

She also appeared in a supporting role in the horror film The Curse of the Living Corpse (1964), which was shot in Stamford, Connecticut, while Hilligoss was living in New York. In 1997, she was asked to appear in the remake of Carnival of Souls, but declined.

Hilligoss was married to actor Nicolas Coster, with whom she had two daughters, Candace and Dinneen. They divorced in 1981. As of 1990, Hilligoss lived in Beverly Hills, California. Her self-published memoir The Odyssey and the Idiocy – Marriage to an Actor was published in 2017.

In 2022, Hilligoss voiced an animated version of herself as she appeared circa 1962 in the CG animated short film Once Upon A Time on Mars.

Filmography

Film

Television

References

Sources

External links

 
 
 Interview with Candace Hilligoss
 Official web site of Candace Hilligoss

1935 births
University of Iowa alumni
American film actresses
American stage actresses
American television actresses
Living people
People from Huron, South Dakota
People from Greater Los Angeles
Actresses from South Dakota
20th-century American actresses
21st-century American women